Franz, Prince of Bavaria (10 October 1875 – 25 January 1957) was a member of the Bavarian Royal House of Wittelsbach and a Major General in the Bavarian Army.

Early life and military career
Franz was born at Schloss Leutstetten, Starnberg, Bavaria. He was the third son of King Ludwig III of Bavaria and his wife Archduchess Maria Theresia of Austria-Este. Initially, Franz served as a commander of the 2. Infanterie-Regiments König, but shortly before the outbreak of World War I, he was given command of the 3. bayerische Infanteriebrigade, which was later renamed and became the 4. Infanterie-Brigade. Prince Franz led this brigade through its victories at Fort Douaumont, Passchendaele and Kemmelberg.

For his exemplary leadership during these operations he was awarded the Knight's Cross of the Military Order of Max Joseph on 25 May 1916 and on  28 October 1916 was given command of the entire 4. Bayerische Infanterie-Division. In Spring 1918, Prince Franz was also awarded the Commander's Cross of the Military Order of Max Joseph and the prestigious Pour le Mérite, Prussia's highest military decoration, on  16 May 1918. However, during the summer 1918, the 4. Bayerische Infanterie-Division suffered severe loses during the Battle of the Somme and was transferred to Italian Front on border protection duties, where he stayed for the remainder of the war.

Marriage

On  12 July 1912 Prince Franz married Princess Isabella Antonie of Croÿ, the daughter of Duke Karl Alfred of Croÿ and Princess Ludmilla of Arenberg. The wedding took place at the Schloss Weilburg in Baden near Vienna, Austria-Hungary. The couple had six children:

 Prince Ludwig of Bavaria (1913–2008); married Princess Irmingard of Bavaria (1923–2010).
 Princess Maria Elisabeth of Bavaria (1914–2011); married Prince Pedro Henrique of Orléans-Braganza (1909–1981).
 Princess Adelgunde Maria of Bavaria (1917–2004); married Baron Zdenko von Hoenning-O'Carroll (1906–1996).
 Princess Eleonore Marie of Bavaria (1918–2009); married Count Konstantin of Waldburg-Zeil (1909–1972).
 Princess Dorothea Therese of Bavaria (1920–2015); married Archduke Gottfried of Austria (1902–1984).
 Prince Rasso Maximilian Rupprecht of Bavaria (1926–2011); married Princess Theresa of Bavaria (b. 1931), they had children:
Maria-Theresia of Bavaria (n. 1956), married Count Tamas Kornis de Goncz-Ruszka.
Franz-Josef Michael Maria Ignatius of Bavaria (1957-2022), was a Benedictine monk, a member of the Roman Catholic Order of Saint Benedict. Until 1996, he lived under the name Pater Florian.
Elizabeth Maria Immaculata Anastasia of Bavaria (n. 1959), married Count Andreas von Kuefstein.
Wolfgang Rupprecht Maria Theodor of Bavaria (n. 1960), married Countess Beatrice of Lodron-Laterano and Castelromano.
Benedikta Maria Gabrielle of Bavaria (n. 1961), married Count Rudolf von Freyberg-Eisenberg.
Christoph Ludwig Maria of Bavaria (n. 1962); married Baroness Gudila von Plettenberg.
Gisela Maria Carolina Aldegunde of Bavaria (n. 1964), married Alexander, Prince of Saxony.

Death
Prince Franz of Bavaria died on  25 January 1957 at Schloss Leutstetten in Starnberg, Bavaria and is buried in the Colombarium in the Michaelskirche in Munich, Bavaria.

Decorations and honors
Bavaria

 Order of St. Hubertus
 Military Order of Max Joseph, Knight's Cross (1916) and Commander's Cross (1918)
 Military Merit Order, Star to 2nd Class with Swords
 Military Merit Order, 2nd Class with Swords
 Military Merit Order, 3rd Class with Crown
 Jubilee Medal
 Service Distinction Cross 2nd Class, for 25 years' service

Prussia

 Order of the Black Eagle
 1914 Iron Cross 1st Class
 1914 Iron Cross 2nd Class
 1918 Wound Badge in Black
 Pour le Mérite
 Order of the Crown, 2nd Class with Star with Swords
 Royal House Order of Hohenzollern, Honor Cross 1st Class with Swords
 Royal House Order of Hohenzollern, Honor Cross 1st Class

Other German states

 Baden: House Order of Fidelity
 Brunswick: War Merit Cross, 2nd. Class
 Hesse-Darmstadt: Ludewig Order
 Lippe-Detmold: War Honor Cross for Heroic Deeds
 Saxony: Order of the Rue Crown
 Duchies of Saxe-Altenburg, Saxe-Coburg-Gotha and Saxe-Meiningen: Ducal Saxe-Ernestine House Order, Grand Cross
 Württemberg: Order of the Württemberg Crown, Grand Cross

Other countries

 Austria-Hungary: Order of the Golden Fleece
 Austria-Hungary: Royal Hungarian Order of St. Stephen, Grand Cross
 Austria-Hungary: Military Merit Cross, 2nd Class with War Decoration
 Ottoman Empire: Imtiaz Medal in Gold with Swords
 Ottoman Empire: Turkish War Medal (so-called "Gallipoli Star")
 Ottoman Empire: Order of Osminieh, 1st Class

Ancestry

References

 Das Bayernbuch vom Kriege 1914-1918, Konrad Krafft von Dellmensingen, Friedrichfranz Feeser, Chr. Belser AG, Verlagsbuchhandlung, Stuttgart 1930
 Die Wittelsbacher. Geschichte unserer Familie. Adalbert, Prinz von Bayern. Prestel Verlag, München, 1979

1875 births
1957 deaths
People from Starnberg
Bavarian generals
People from the Kingdom of Bavaria
Princes of Bavaria
House of Wittelsbach
Knights of the Golden Fleece of Austria
Recipients of the Pour le Mérite (military class)
Commanders of the Military Order of Max Joseph
Members of the Bavarian Reichsrat
Recipients of the Iron Cross (1914), 1st class
Recipients of the Gold Imtiyaz Medal
Grand Crosses of the Order of Saint Stephen of Hungary
Burials at St. Michael's Church, Munich
Sons of kings